Hakea chordophylla, commonly known as  bootlace oak, bootlace tree, corkwood, or bull oak, is a species  of shrub or small tree in the family Proteaceae found in central and northern Australia. Bares very showy golden yellow, pale green or cream nectar rich flowers in winter.

Description
Hakea chordophylla  is a lignotuberous  gnarled shrub or small tree 2 to 6 metres (7 to 20 ft) high with an open habit and slightly hanging branches. The trunk has thick corklike bark with many furrows and often contorted smaller branches. The long needle-like leaves are tough and thick from 22 to 42 cm (9–16 in) long and 1.6 to 2.9 mm wide. On occasion with dense upright or sparse hairs. Flowers from June to August.

Taxonomy and naming
The species was first formally described by Victorian Government Botanist Ferdinand von Mueller in 1857, from  plant material collected at Sturt Creek in the Northern Territory. The description was published in Hooker's Journal of Botany and Kew Garden Miscellany. Its specific epithet (chordophylla) is derived from Ancient Greek chorde meaning "gut", "string of a musical instrument", "twine" or "rope" and phyllon meaning "leaf". It belongs to a group of related species known as the corkbarks, or lorea group, within the genus Hakea, most of which are found across Australia's arid interior.

Distribution and habitat
Hakea chordophylla ranges across the interior of central and northern Australia, from western Queensland though to northern Western Australia, to south of Karratha. A widespread species growing in spinifex grassland, woodland and scrubland on stony or red-brown sandy soil sometimes in stony laterite.

Use in horticulture
This hakea is a slow growing but attractive plant in cultivation, its leaves and bark a feature. Full sun and good drainage are helpful.

References

chordophylla
Flora of Queensland
Flora of Western Australia
Flora of the Northern Territory
Plants described in 1857
Taxa named by Ferdinand von Mueller